The Council Tower of Sibiu is a tower situated between the two main squares of the Historic center in Sibiu, the Great Square (Piața Mare) and the Small Square (Piața Mică). 

It was built in the 12th century, but was also rebuilt multiple times, with its architecture getting changed.

In the course of history, the tower played different roles, being used, among others, as a wheat storage or as an observation point in case of fire. Nowadays, it is used for exhibitions.

The Council Tower is considered the most iconic building of Sibiu, which was the European Capital of Culture in 2007. Being the city's symbol, it is often found on Sibiu souvenirs or any kind of advertisement relating to the city.

See also
 Eyes of Sibiu
 Sibiu Lutheran Cathedral 
 Jesuit Church of Sibiu
 Bridge of Lies 

Towers in Romania